Oreobates zongoensis is a species of frog in the family Strabomantidae. It is endemic to Bolivia from Valle del Zongo, in Pedro Domingo Murillo Province.

Description
The holotype, an adult male, measures  in snout–vent length. The head is slightly wider than the body and slightly wider than it is long. The snout is subacuminate. The canthus rostralis is evident. The tympanum is visible. Skin of head, dorsum, flanks, and hind limbs strongly and uniformly tuberculate, while skin of forelimbs and ventral surfaces is smooth. The fingers and toes have small discs but no webbing or lateral fringes. The head, dorsum, and flanks are dark pinkish brown, without any markings. The upper surfaces of forelimbs and posterior hind limbs are purple to brown, while the chest and ventral sides of forelimbs pinkish and the venter and ventral sides of hind limbs are pinkish brown. The iris is orange and has fine, black reticulum.

Habitat and conservation

Oreobates zongoensis is only known from Zongo Valley. The type locality has been entirely destroyed with the construction of a hydroelectric power plant. In 2016, several more were discovered in an intact forest patch in the Zongo Valley.

References

zongoensis
Amphibians of Bolivia
Endemic fauna of Bolivia
Amphibians described in 1997
Taxa named by Jörn Köhler
Taxonomy articles created by Polbot